Martha Maria Snell Berkeley  (18 August 1813 – 7 July 1899) was an Australian artist.

Born in Keynsham, England on 18 August 1813, she married Captain Charles Berkeley before migrating to Australia in 1836 with him and her sister, Theresa Walker (who became Australia's first female sculptor). They sailed to South Australia on board the John Renwick.

Her work is included in the collections of the Art Gallery of South Australia and the National Library of Australia.

Berkeley died in Camberwell, Victoria on 7 July 1899. At least two daughters survived her.

References

1813 births
1899 deaths
19th-century Australian women artists
19th-century Australian painters
19th-century English women artists
19th-century English painters
English emigrants to Australia